Marit Bjørgen (born 21 March 1980) is a former Norwegian cross-country skier. She is ranked first in the all-time Cross-Country World Cup rankings with 114 individual victories. Bjørgen is also the most successful sprinter in Cross-Country World Cup history, with 29 victories. She headed the medal table at the 2010 Winter Olympics by winning five medals, including three gold. A five-time Olympian, her five Olympic medals at the 2018 Pyeongchang Games brought her total number of medals up to a record 15, the most by any athlete in Winter Olympics history.

On 6 April 2018, Bjørgen announced her retirement from cross–country skiing following the 2017–18 season. In May 2020, she announced that she would return to competition with long-distance cross-country ski squad Team Ragde Eiendom, with a focus on competing in Vasaloppet in March 2021.

On 28 April 2022, she announced the end of her career by also finishing her long-distance career.

World Cup
Marit Bjørgen initially excelled at the sprint events, and seven victories in that event was enough to give her second place overall in the 2003–04 FIS Cross-Country World Cup season. However, in the 2004–05 season, Bjørgen became an accomplished distance skier.

On 19 March 2006 in Sapporo, Japan, Bjørgen claimed her second FIS World Cup title. Bjørgen led the overall World Cup by 66 points, ahead of Canada's Beckie Scott going into the final race of the season, the 2 x 7.5 km double pursuit. Scott needed to win the race and for Bjørgen to finish no higher than eighth to claim the title. Scott did win the race but Bjørgen came fourth, winning the crystal globe with 1036 points to Scott's 1020. Bjørgen also won the sprint title for the season, 6 points ahead of Norway's Ella Gjømle, making the 2005–06 season the fourth season in a row that Bjørgen has won the sprint title. Bjørgen finished the distance standings in fourth place, 108 points behind Russia's Julija Tchepalova.

Bjørgen made the podium eight times during the 2005–06 season, six of them in first place, one second and one third place. Bjørgen now has 70 podium finishes, 46 of them in first place, 13 in second and 11 in third. 22 of her victories have been in the sprint, which is by far her most successful event. Seven of these victories were in the 2003–04 season and they have decreased in the past few seasons whilst her results in the other disciplines have improved. She has nine victories in the 10 km and seven in the pursuit. Her four other victories have been in longer races (30 km. and Vasaloppet).

Bjørgen has competed in the World Cup since 2000, when she finished the season in 53rd place overall and 48th in the sprints. The season after she finished the overall season in 32nd and the sprint in 36th. The season after however (2002–03) she won the sprint title and finished in 6th place overall. The 2003–04 season was Bjørgen's best season up until that time when she again won the sprint title, and came 11th in the distance standings, finishing the season in 2nd place behind Gabriella Paruzzi. In the 2004–05 season she won all the titles, and again won the overall and sprint title in 2005–06.
In 2011–12 she claimed the overall title for the third time, ahead of Poland's Justyna Kowalczyk.

In 2015 Bjørgen won her first Tour de Ski after nine attempts, defeating reigning champion and compatriot Therese Johaug by over one and a half minutes.

World Championships
Bjørgen has eighteen World Championship gold medals, twelve of them individual. Her first gold medal in the World Championships came in the individual sprint in Val di Fiemme in 2003, where she also picked up a silver in the 4 × 5 km. She took three medals in Oberstdorf in 2005 in the 30 km classical, team sprint, and 4 × 5 km. She also won a silver in the 7.5 km + 7.5 km double pursuit and a bronze in the 10 km free in the same games. At the 2007 championships in Sapporo, Bjørgen won two bronze medals in team sprint (with Astrid Jacobsen) and in the 4 × 5 km. In Holmenkollen 2011 she won the individual sprint, the pursuit, the 10 km classical, the 4 × 5 km, and a silver in the 30km.  In the 2013 Val di Fiemme World Championships she won the individual sprint, the double pursuit, the 4 x 5 km, the 30 km, and a silver in the 10 km freestyle.

In the World Championships 2011, held at Holmenkollen, Oslo, during February and March 2011, Bjørgen won gold medals in the Sprint, the 10-kilometre classic, the 15-kilometre pursuit and the 4 × 5-kilometre relay.  She also finished second to Therese Johaug in the 30-kilometre freestyle.

Olympics

Bjørgen had a disappointing Winter Olympics in Turin. She suffered from bronchitis a week before the games started and was prescribed antibiotics, then in the first race of the games, the 7.5 km + 7.5 km double pursuit, Bjørgen withdrew during the classic phase complaining of an upset stomach. In the next event, the team sprint, Bjørgen and Hilde G. Pedersen came fourth, and despite winning a silver in the 10 km, the remainder of the games went poorly for her. The next event was the 4 × 5 km relay, where Bjørgen took the anchor leg and finished in fifth place, the first time since 1988 that Norway had failed to reach the podium in the women's relay. In the individual sprint, Bjørgen failed to make the semi finals, and both Bjørgen and Pedersen decided not to compete in the 30 km and returned home to Norway. Afterwards she was quoted as saying she was "sick and tired of Pragelato and OL (Olympic games)".

However Bjørgen recovered to win the 45 km Vasaloppet from Oxberg to Mora on 4 March, eight days after the end of the Winter Olympics. Bjørgen broke away with Hilde Pedersen and Vibeke Skofterud after only 10 km, but Skofterud could not keep up with the pace and fell back, and Bjørgen powered away from Pedersen with a few kilometres left, winning in a time of 2:17:53, 1:22 ahead of Pedersen and 3:23 ahead of Petra Majdič of Slovenia. Winning a purse of 88,000 SEK and also winning two of the three sprints during the race to add another 10,000 SEK. Then three days later on 7 March, Bjørgen finished second in the individual sprint event in Borlänge, Sweden.

In the 2010 Winter Olympics in Vancouver, Bjørgen finished third in the 10 km freestyle event, before winning her first Olympic gold medal in the sprint. In the sprint she was up against a very strong field, consisting of Petra Majdič of Slovenia who had taken a serious fall earlier in the day during qualification, and Justyna Kowalczyk of Poland who was leading the overall World Cup standings coming into the race. Bjørgen won her second gold in the 2 × 7.5-kilometre on 19 February 2010. Bjørgen was also part of the 4 × 5 km relay team that won gold on 25 February 2010, finishing with enough time to cross the line with a large Norwegian flag given to her by a spectator near the finish, and jumping over the finish line. She closed out her trip in Vancouver by taking silver 0.3 seconds behind Poland's Justyna Kowalczyk in the women's 30 km event.

Bjørgen won gold at the 2014 Winter Olympics in Sochi in the 15 km skiathlon, the Team sprint and the 30km freestyle race. These three Olympic medals brought her total up to ten, equaling the record for most Winter Olympic medals held by a woman, already achieved by Stefania Belmondo and Raisa Smetanina; but of the three record holders at the time, Bjørgen had the most golds.

Bjørgen is a five-time Olympian, having competed in every Winter Olympics since Salt Lake City in 2002 where she won her first silver medal. At the 2018 Winter Olympics in Pyeongchang she won her 11th–15th Olympic medals, the highest number of medals won by any athlete in Winter Olympics history.

Holmenkollen
Bjørgen won the women's 30 km event at the Holmenkollen ski festival in 2005. She won the same event five years later in 2010. This was the first World Cup event to be held at Holmenkollen since the completion of the new ski jumping hill. For her win in both the 30 km and the sprint event, along with her successes at the 2010 Games in Vancouver, Bjørgen was awarded the Holmenkollen medal. On 11 March 2018, Bjørgen won a record seventh 30 km in Holmenkollen.

International Fair Play Mecenate Award
Bjørgen was awarded the International Fair Play Mecenate award for 2014. The jury of the Fair Play Mecenate consists of members from all continents and represents the international sports media and various international sports organisations. The jury states that the Fair Play Mecenate is awarded Marit Bjørgen "for the particular ethical and fair play behaviour that you have always had both in your agonistic career and in your demonstrations of great sportsmanship and solidarity".

Asthma medications
In the 2009–2010 season Bjørgen had a Therapeutic Use Exemption (TUE) issued by the International Ski Federation (FIS) for the asthma medication Symbicort which contained substances on the World Anti-Doping Agency (WADA) prohibited list. Bjørgen continued to use the medication over the 2010 Olympics and was strongly criticized by Justyna Kowalczyk who accused her of doping.  athletes no longer need a TUE for Symbicort, and the drug can be used by any athlete but only in a restricted dose.

Cross-country skiing results
All results are sourced from the International Ski Federation (FIS).

Olympic Games
 15 medals – (8 gold, 4 silver, 3 bronze)

World Championships
 26 medals – (18 gold, 5 silver, 3 bronze)

a.  Cancelled due to extremely cold weather.

World Cup

Season titles
 12 titles – (4 overall, 3 distance, 5 sprint)

Season standings

Individual podiums
 114 victories – (84 , 30 ) 
 184 podiums – (126 , 58 )

Team podiums
 30 victories – (20 , 10 ) 
 37 podiums – (27 , 10 )

Personal life
Bjørgen lives with her partner Fred Børre Lundberg, a former Olympic champion in Nordic combined, in Holmenkollen, Oslo. In 2015, Bjørgen announced that she was pregnant and would not compete in the coming season, aiming for a return in the 2017 season. Her first son was born on 26 December 2015. After having retired at the end of the 2018 season she gave birth to a second son in March 2019.

References

External links
 
 
 
ESPN
fasterskier

1980 births
Cross-country skiers at the 2002 Winter Olympics
Cross-country skiers at the 2006 Winter Olympics
Cross-country skiers at the 2010 Winter Olympics
Cross-country skiers at the 2014 Winter Olympics
Cross-country skiers at the 2018 Winter Olympics
Medalists at the 2010 Winter Olympics
Medalists at the 2014 Winter Olympics
Medalists at the 2018 Winter Olympics
Holmenkollen medalists
Holmenkollen Ski Festival winners
Living people
Norwegian female cross-country skiers
Olympic cross-country skiers of Norway
Vasaloppet winners
Olympic gold medalists for Norway
Olympic silver medalists for Norway
Olympic bronze medalists for Norway
Sportspeople from Trondheim
Olympic medalists in cross-country skiing
FIS Nordic World Ski Championships medalists in cross-country skiing
FIS Cross-Country World Cup champions
People from Midtre Gauldal
Medalists at the 2006 Winter Olympics
Tour de Ski winners
Tour de Ski skiers